Depressive anxiety is a term developed in relation to the depressive position by Melanie Klein, building on Freud's seminal article on object relations of 1917, 'Mourning and Melancholia'. Depressive anxiety revolved around a felt state of inner danger produced by the fear of having harmed good internal objects - as opposed to the persecutory fear of ego annihilation more typical of paranoid anxiety.

It may be distinguished from a depressive mood, which need not necessarily be tinged with anxiety.

Stages
Depressive anxiety can be aroused at every developmental stage, from weaning through to the loss of familial dependence of adolescence or of one's youth in later life. Continual oscillation between paranoid and depressive anxieties can create a sense of psychic imprisonment; while conversely a lasting shift from the former to the latter can be seen as one of the marks of a successful analytic process.

Defences against depressive anxiety
Defences against depressive anxiety include projective identification, whereby the anxieties are denied in oneself and placed in another person; a manic denial of the reality of an inner world at all; or a psychic retreat into a reduced and apathetic state of diminished feelings.

Didier Anzieu saw Freud's theoretical construction of psychoanalysis as a compulsive intellectualized defence against depressive anxiety.

See also

The referenced article has very good discussions of defenses. See headings defenses against paranoid anxiety and defenses against depressive anxiety.

References

Further reading
 Klein, Mélanie (1946). "Notes on some schizoid mechanisms". Envy and gratitude and other works 1946-1963. Hogarth Press and the Institute of Psycho-Analysis (published 1975). .
 Klein, Mélanie; Riviere, Joan (1964) "Love, guilt, and reparation" in link Love, Hate, and Reparation New York, NY: Norton 
 Grotstein, James S. (1981). Splitting and projective identification. New York, NY: Jason Aronson. .
Ogden, Thomas H. (1989). The primitive edge of experience. Northvale, NJ: Jason Aronson. ..
 Klein, Mélanie (1952). "Some theoretical conclusions regarding the emotional life of the infant". Envy and gratitude and other works 1946-1963. Hogarth Press and the Institute of Psycho-Analysis (published 1975). .
 Segal, H. (1981). The work of Hanna Segal: A Kleinian approach to clinical practice. New York, NY: Jason Aronson. .
John Steiner, in Robin Anderson ed., Clinical Lectures on Klein and Bion (London 1992) p. 46-58

External links
Klein Trust (with extensive resources listings)
What is FOMO & How FOMO Affects Mental Health
Kleinian Studies Ejournal (with numerous detailed links)
Anxiety Disorders – Types, Causes, Diagnosis & Treatment

Object relations theory
Depression (mood)
Anxiety
Paranoia